USS LST-560 was a United States Navy  in commission from 1944 to 1946.

Construction and commissioning
LST-560 was laid down on 22 February 1944 at Evansville, Indiana, by the Missouri Valley Bridge and Iron Company. She was launched on 21 April 1944, sponsored by Mrs. L. C. Holm, and commissioned on 2 May 1944.

Service history
During World War II, LST-560 was assigned to the Pacific Theater of Operations, where was a unit of LST Division 43 under LST Group 22 (commanded by Commander E. H. Pope, USN), which was a component of LST Flotilla Eight (commanded by Captain E. Watts, USN). She took part in the Philippines campaign, participating in the landings on Palawan Island in March 1945 and the landings in the Visayan Islands in March and April 1945. She then took part in the Brunei Bay operation on Borneo in June 1945.

Following the war, LST-560 performed occupation duty in the Far East until mid-October 1945, when she departed for the United States.

Decommissioning and disposal
After returning to the United States, LST-560 was decommissioned on 17 May 1946 and stricken from the Navy List on 19 June 1946. On 12 September 1946, she was sold to the Construction Power and Merchandising Company of Brooklyn, New York.

Honors and awards
LST-560 earned two battle stars for her World War II service.

References

NavSource Online: Amphibious Photo Archive LST-560

 

LST-542-class tank landing ships
World War II amphibious warfare vessels of the United States
Ships built in Evansville, Indiana
1944 ships